Senta is a town and municipality in Serbia.

Senta may also refer to:

FK Senta, football team based in Senta, Serbia
Senta (moth), a genus of moths
Sennybridge Training Area, or SENTA, a UK Ministry of Defence military training area in Wales
550 Senta, an asteroid
, a World War II Norwegian cargo ship sunk while part of Convoy SC 104
Senta, a character in the Wagner opera The Flying Dutchman

People
Senta Berger (born 1941), Austrian actress and producer
Senta Geißler (1902–2000), German painter
Senta Moses (born 1973), American actress
Senta Söneland (1882–1934), German actress
Senta Trömel-Plötz (born 1939), German linguist
Senta Wengraf (1924–2020), Austrian actress

See also
Battle of Zenta or Senta, fought in 1697 near Senta, Serbia